Min Mya Hnit was the only child of King Minye Kyawswa I and Queen Min Hla Nyet of Ava. She married her first cousin Thinkhaya of Twinthin during her father's reign (1439–), and died during the early reign of her uncle King Narapati I of Ava (r. 1442–1468). Her husband later became known as Gov. Thihapate II of Pakhan.

Ancestry
The following is her ancestry as given in the Hmannan Yazawin chronicle. Her parents were double cousins.

Notes

References

Bibliography
 
 

Ava dynasty
15th-century Burmese women